Korey is a given name and surname. Notable people with the name include:

Given name
Korey Banks (born 1979), defensive back for the BC Lions of the Canadian Football League
Korey Cooper (born 1972), the keyboardist, guitarist, and backing vocalist for the Christian rock band Skillet
Korey Hall (born 1983), American football fullback
Korey Jones (born 1989), American football player
Korey Smith (born 1991), English professional footballer who plays for Swansea City
Korey Stringer (1974–2001), American football player who died from complications brought on by heat stroke
Korey Williams (born 1987), American football player

Surname
Tinsel Korey (born 1980), Canadian actress and musician
William Korey (1922–2009), lobbyist on international issues for B'nai B'rith

See also
Kory (given name)
Kory (disambiguation), includes people with the surname Kory
Corey, given name and surname
Korie, given name and surname